Antonino Mangione (born April 1, 1987) is an American politician from the Republican Party who is a member of the Maryland House of Delegates representing district 42B, which includes the communities of Towson, Timonium, Parkville, and Cockeysville. He also served as a Baltimore County co-chair for the state's Trump Victory Leadership County team.

Background
Mangione was born in Baltimore County, Maryland. He attended Towson University, where he received his B.A. in political science in 2009. After graduating, Mangione worked as an intern and later a show host from 2017–2018 with WCBM 680, a talk radio station owned by his family.

In July 2017, Mangione filed to run for Maryland House of Delegates. He said that he was inspired to run for office by his late grandfather, Nicholas Mangione, a real estate developer who grew up in a poor Italian immigrant family. He won the general election alongside Democrat Michele Guyton with 28.6 percent of the vote.

Conflict of interest
Mangione has come under criticism for various conflicts of interest that could possibly arise from his relation with WCBM 680. While Mangione was a webmaster and a host, WCBM reposted several videos and posts advertising Mangione's campaign. The promotion from the station was not reported as in-kind contributions. Additionally, Mangione's campaign Facebook page reported that Towson University had offered a new scholarship solely for undocumented students, though according to a university spokesman it had never existed. WCBM then created a web page on its website about the scholarship, linking back to Mangione's campaign Facebook page. Mangione has stated that he does not see WCBM posts or his radio show as in-kind contributions to his campaign.

In the legislature
Mangione was sworn in as a member of the House of Delegates on January 9, 2019, and appointed to the Appropriations committee. He serves on the health & social services subcommittee and the oversight committee on pensions.

Political positions

Crime
During his 2018 campaign, Mangione ran on creating "safe communities" by getting tough on illegal drug dealers. He introduced an amendment to legislation in the 2021 legislative session that would block people convicted as an adult for more than one murder when they were a minor from seeking reconsideration of prior life without parole sentences; his proposal was rejected in a 54-79 vote.

Education
During his 2018 campaign, Mangione said that he voiced support for expanding charter schools. During the 2020 legislative session, Mangione was one of two legislators to vote against legislation that would provide an additional $577 million in funding over 10 years to historically black colleges and universities in Maryland.

During the 2021 legislative session, Mangione cosponsored legislation that would ban convicted sex offenders from being students at Maryland public schools.

In July 2021, Mangione called for the firing of Baltimore City school administrators after an investigation by Project Baltimore found that 41 percent of all Baltimore City high school students earned less than a 1.0 grade-point average.

Immigration
During his 2018 campaign, Mangione was a vocal opponent to illegal immigration and said that he would not support legislation that would turn Maryland into a sanctuary state. During the 2020 legislative session, Mangione voted to sustain Governor Larry Hogan's veto on legislation that would allow Maryland high school graduates including undocumented immigrants to qualify for the lowest tuition rates at public colleges and universities under certain circumstances, saying that he feared the bill would encourage more illegal immigration.

Social issues
During protests against the murder of George Floyd in June 2020, protesters in the Little Italy neighborhood of Baltimore tore down and threw a statue of Christopher Columbus into the Jones Falls canal of the Baltimore Harbor. Following this incident, Mangione called to protect the statue and introduced legislation that would prohibit any person from destroying, damaging, vandalizing or desecrating a monument, memorial, or statue of historical significance.

Electoral history

References

Republican Party members of the Maryland House of Delegates
Living people
People from Baltimore County, Maryland
Towson University alumni
21st-century American politicians
1987 births